Kyun Tum Say Itna Pyar Hai is a Pakistani Urdu film starring Arbaaz Khan, Veena Malik, Babrik Shah, Ajab Gul, and Sana Nawaz. This is the second directorial project of Ajab Gul after Khoey Ho Tum Kahan. This film is directed by Ajab Gul who has a long affiliation with the TV, stage and film industry in Pakistan. The film is a blend of family drama, romance, and action, typical of most Lollywood movies.

Plot
The film starts as a clash between good and evil, a landscape that many suggest marks cinema across the world. The pursuits are represented in the film by two individuals who are deeply committed to their way of life. The characters are rendered by artists Nadeem and Talat Hussain.

The families of the two, a former judge (Nadeem) and ex-chief minister (Talat Hussain) are interlinked by nuptials, but do not serve as bonds. Talat is a power-hungry politician who stops at nothing—bribery, killings, abductions—to achieve his goals. He is under investigation and the man in charge of the case is Nadeem's character, the traditional upstanding citizen and an upholder of values and justice.

The only blemish in Nadeem’s life are his two wives, one being Ajab Gul’s mother with whom he has a strained relationship. Police officer Babrak Shah by the other wife is acknowledged as his son and so the stepbrothers have a strong dislike for each other. They also share the love of the same girl (Talat's daughter played by Veena Malik) whose marriage to Babrak deepens the enmity and a sense of deprivation in Gul.

Renowned television and film actors such as Tahira Wasti and Nighat Chaudhry play supporting roles in the move. 

While the first half of the film explores the family drama, the second half is focused on action.

Cast
 Arbaaz Khan
 Veena Malik
 Ajab Gul
 Sana Nawaz
 Rasheed Naz
 Babrak Shah
 Asif Khan
 Priya
 Nadeem
 Tahira Wasti
 Nighat Chaudhry
 Raza

External links
 

2005 films